Orraya is a monotypic genus of lizard in the family Carphodactylidae. The genus contains the sole species Orraya occultus, also known commonly as the McIlwraith leaf-tailed gecko or the long-necked northern leaf-tailed gecko. The species is endemic to Australia.

Geographic range
O. occultus is restricted to higher elevations in the McIlwraith Range in northeastern Queensland.

Habitat

Description
O. occultus may attain a snout-to-vent length (SVL) of almost . It is moderately spinose, and has a very long, thin neck.

Reproduction
O. occultus is oviparous.

References

Further reading
Cogger HG (2014). Reptiles and Amphibians of Australia, Seventh Edition. Clayton, Victoria, Australia: CSIRO Publishing. xxx + 1,033 pp. .
Couper PJ, Covacevich JA, Moritz C (1993). "A review of the leaf-tailed geckos endemic to eastern Australia: a new genus, four new species, and other new data". Memoirs of the Queensland Museum 34 (1): 95–124. (Saltuarius occultus, new species).
Couper PJ, Schneider CJ, Hoskin CJ, Covacevich JA (2000). "Australian leaf-toed geckos: phylogeny, a new genus, two new species and other new data". Memoirs of the Queensland Museum 45 (2): 253–265. ("Orraya ", new genus; Orraya occultus, new combination).
Wilson S, Swan G (2013). A Complete Guide to Reptiles of Australia, Fourth Edition. Sydney: New Holland Publishers. 522 pp. .

Carphodactylidae
Geckos of Australia
Monotypic lizard genera
Taxa named by Patrick J. Couper
Taxa named by Jeanette Covacevich
Taxa named by Christopher J. Schneider (herpetologist)
Taxa named by Conrad J. Hoskin